Natasha Bowen is a Nigerian-Welsh writer and teacher. She writes fantasy books for young adults. She is best known for her New York Times Bestselling novel Skin of the Sea.

Early life and education 
Natasha Bowen was born in Cambridge, England, to a Nigerian Yoruba father and a Welsh mother. She grew up in Cambridge with little exposure to her Nigerian heritage, with which she would later connect in life and use in writing her novel. She studied Creative Writing at Bath Spa University. After graduating, she moved to East London, where she became a teacher.

Personal life
Bowen has three children. She lives in the UK with her family.

Career 
Bowen's debut novel Skin of the Sea, the first book in the Of Mermaid and Orisa series inspired by her Nigerian heritage, African folklore, Yoruba culture, and her love for mermaids, was published on 2 November 2021 by Random House. She wrote the novel while teaching full-time in a school.

The novel follows Simi, a Mami Wata who travels across sea and land in search of the Supreme Creator after breaking a law that threatens the existence of all Mami Wata. The book entered the New York Times and Indie bestseller lists and received several positive reviews from book reviewers who praised the novel for its similarities with The Little Mermaid and the use of Black mermaids and Yoruba culture to show the Transatlantic Slave Trade.

A sequel titled Soul of the Deep is scheduled for release on September 27, 2022.

Bibliography 
Of Mermaid and Orisa Series
 Skin of the Sea. (November 2, 2021) Random House
 Soul of the Deep. (forthcoming, 2022) Random House

References 

21st-century British women writers
21st-century Nigerian novelists
21st-century Welsh novelists
British fantasy writers
British writers of young adult literature
Date of birth missing (living people)
Living people
Nigerian fantasy writers
Nigerian novelists
Nigerian women writers
Welsh people of Nigerian descent
Year of birth missing (living people)